Donghe District (Mongolian:   Düŋhė toɣoriɣ) is a district of Baotou, the largest city of Inner Mongolia, People's Republic of China.

References

www.xzqh.org 

County-level divisions of Inner Mongolia